Zahid Sadiq (born May 6, 1965) was a Kenyan cricketer. He was a right-handed batsman who played for Surrey from 1988 to 1989 and for Derbyshire in 1990.

Sadiq played initially for Surrey. He had to be registered specifically for a single game for Derbyshire in the 1990 season, though he had officially been offered a contract for 1991. He signed for Surrey in 1993 but again, did not have much success with bat or ball.

In 2001, he appeared for Marylebone Cricket Club in a tour of Namibia. Sadiq's cousin, Aftab Habib, is a former England Test cricketer. Sadiq was an upper-middle-order batsman.

External links
Zahid Sadiq at Cricket Archive 

1965 births
Living people
Kenyan cricketers
Kenyan Muslims
Kenyan people of Indian descent
Derbyshire cricketers
Surrey cricketers
Surrey Cricket Board cricketers